Sainte-Monique is a municipality in Quebec, Canada.  It is sometimes known as Sainte-Monique-de-Honfleur (for example, on its official website).

Demographics
Population trend:
 Population in 2011: 865 (2006 to 2011 population change: -5.4%)
 Population in 2006: 914
 Population in 2001: 930
 Population in 1996: 954
 Population in 1991: 910

Private dwellings occupied by usual residents: 360 (total dwellings: 453)

Mother tongue:
 English as first language: 0%
 French as first language: 98.9%
 English and French as first language: 0%
 Other as first language: 1.1%

See also
 List of municipalities in Quebec

References

Municipalities in Quebec
Incorporated places in Saguenay–Lac-Saint-Jean